The Bishop of Peterborough is the ordinary of the Church of England Diocese of Peterborough in the Province of Canterbury.

The diocese covers the counties of Northamptonshire (including the Soke of Peterborough) and Rutland.  The see is in the City of Peterborough, where the bishop's seat (cathedra) is located at the Cathedral Church of Saint Peter, Saint Paul and Saint Andrew. The bishop's residence is Bishop's Lodging, The Palace, Peterborough. The office has been in existence since the foundation of the diocese on 4 September 1541 under King Henry VIII.

The position of bishop of Peterborough is currently vacant. The current acting bishop is John Holbrook, Bishop of Brixworth. 

Donald Allister, who was the Archdeacon of Chester in the Diocese of Chester from 2002 to 2010, was consecrated as a bishop on 25 March 2010 at St Paul's Cathedral by Rowan Williams, Archbishop of Canterbury and was installed at Peterborough Cathedral on 17 April 2010.

As parts of the City of Peterborough are actually in the Diocese of Ely (those parishes south of the River Nene), the last Bishop of Peterborough was appointed as an assistant bishop in the Diocese of Ely with pastoral care for these parishes delegated to him by the Bishop of Ely.

List of bishops
Chronological list of the bishops of the Diocese of Peterborough, England

Assistant bishops
Among those called "Assistant Bishop of Peterborough" were:
August 1881November 1900: John Mitchinson (Rector of Sibstone then Master of Pembroke College, Oxford)
1912–1971 (d.): Lewis Clayton, Canon residentiary of Peterborough Cathedral and former Bishop suffragan of Leicester
19261945 (ret.): Norman Lang, Canon residentiary of Peterborough Cathedral; Archdeacon of Northampton (until 1936), of Oakham (thereafter); and former Bishop suffragan of Leicester (resigned his suffragan See due to the erection of the Diocese of Leicester, but continued in essentially the same role)
19501963: Charles Aylen, Vicar of Flore (1945–58) and non-residentiary Canon of Peterborough (1946–61); former Bishop of St Helena
1952–1957 (res.): Gerald Vernon, Vicar of Finedon and former Bishop of Madagascar
1957–1969 (d.): Weston Stewart, Rector of Cottesmore, Rutland until 1964 and former Bishop in Jerusalem
19781986 (ret.): William Franklin. former Bishop of Colombia

Honorary assistant bishops — retired bishops taking on occasional duties voluntarily — have included:
1974–1978 (d.): Guy Marshall, Vicar of Blakesley with Adstone, former suffragan Bishop in Venezuela (Diocese of Trinidad and Tobago)
1975–1984 (res.): Alan Rogers, retired Bishop of Fulham and of Edmonton
1981–1985 Paul Burrough, Rector of Empingham, Rutland and retired Bishop of Mashonaland.

See also
List of abbots of Peterborough
Dean of Peterborough

Notes

References

Haydn, Joseph and Ockerby, Horace Haydn's Book of Dignities W.H. Allen & Co. Ltd., London, 1894 reprinted 1969
Whitaker's Almanack Joseph Whitaker & Sons Ltd. and A&C Black Publishers Ltd., London, 1883 to 2004
 King, Richard John Handbook to the Cathedrals of England (Part II: History of the See, with Short Notices of the principal Bishops) John Murray, London, 1862

External links
Diocese of Peterborough website

 
Peterborough
Bishops of Peterborough
Anglican Diocese of Peterborough